Cryptologa nystalea is a moth of the family Gracillariidae described by Thomas Bainbrigge Fletcher in 1921. It is known from Karnataka and Maharashtra in India.

The larvae feed on Pongamia pinnata. They probably mine the leaves of their host plant.

References

Gracillariinae
Moths of Asia
Moths described in 1921